Brad W. Setser is an American economist. He is a former staff economist at the United States Department of the Treasury, worked at Roubini Global Economics Monitor as Director of Global Research where he co-authored the book "Bailouts or Bail-ins?" with Nouriel Roubini, as a fellow for international economics at the Council on Foreign Relations, for the United States National Economic Council as Director of International Economics, for the United States Department of the Treasury, and as Deputy Assistant Secretary for International Economic Analysis as senior fellow for international economics at the Council on Foreign Relations.

Career
After leaving the RGE in 2007, Setser became a fellow for international economics at the Council on Foreign Relations.  In 2009, he took a position with the National Economic Council, as Director of International Economics. In 2011, he moved to the United States Department of the Treasury, where he was the Deputy Assistant Secretary for International Economic Analysis where he worked on  Europe’s financial crisis, U.S. currency policy, financial sanctions, commodity shocks, and Puerto Rico’s debt crisis.

In 2015, he returned as the Steven A. Tananbaum senior fellow for international economics at the Council on Foreign Relations.  He is the author of the economics blog "Follow the Money" about global economic imbalances, which The Washington Post described in 2016 as a "must-read for those in the economics blogosphere".

Setser has been interviewed in financial publications such as The Wall Street Journal and the Financial Times on U.S. international economic issues. Setser has also written opinion pieces including in The New York Times and The Wall Street Journal on U.S. international economic policy.

In November 2020, Setser was named a member of the Joe Biden presidential transition Agency Review Team to support transition efforts related to the Office of the United States Trade Representative.

Bibliography

See also
 Base erosion and profit shifting
 Leprechaun economics
 Ireland as a tax haven
 EU illegal State aid case against Apple in Ireland
 Double Irish, Single Malt, and CAIA

References

External links
 "Follow the Money," Brad Setser's blog at the Council on Foreign Relations
 Brad Setser C-SPAN
 Bloomberg TV: Brad Setser

American bloggers
21st-century American economists
Living people
Alumni of the University of Oxford
Harvard University alumni
21st-century American non-fiction writers
Year of birth missing (living people)